Curtin Mauritius is one of the international campuses of Curtin University (Perth, Western Australia) is a public research university known as Charles Telfair Campus in Mauritius. It is part of the tertiary education Commission and offers certificate, diploma, undergraduate, and postgraduate degree programmes. Curtin University opened its fourth international campus in Mauritius on 3 May 2018.

Curtin Mauritius 
Curtin Mauritius affords students with up-to-date facilities, alongside well-qualified staff. The university also helps students through its strong links with industry practitioners. An education from Curtin Mauritius is a globally recognised education.

Charles Telfair Campus 
The Charles Telfair Campus has over 18 years of experience in the management and delivery of international tertiary education programmes. In addition to operating Curtin Mauritius, the campus hosts and manages several international programmes and has diploma and degree awarding powers. The Charles Telfair Campus also offers a growing number of local programmes.

References

External links
 Official website

Higher education in Mauritius
Universities in Mauritius